Netherlands  competed at the 2019 World Aquatics Championships in Gwangju, South Korea from 12 to 28 July.

Medalists

Artistic swimming

The Netherlands entered 2 artistic swimmers (2 female).

Diving

The Netherlands entered 2 divers (2 female).

Women

Open water swimming

The Netherlands qualified two male and two female open water swimmers.

Men

Women

Mixed

Swimming

The Netherlands entered 18 swimmers.

Men

Women

Mixed

 Legend: (*) = Swimmers who participated in the heat only.

Water polo

Women's tournament

Team roster

Joanne Koenders
Maud Megens
Dagmar Genee (C)
Sabrina van der Sloot
Iris Wolves
Nomi Stomphorst
Bente Rogge
Vivian Sevenich
Maartje Keuning
Ilse Koolhaas
Simone van de Kraats
Rozanne Voorvelt
Sarah Buis
Coach: Arno Havenga

Group A

Playoffs

Quarterfinals

5th–8th place semifinals

Seventh place game

References

World Aquatics Championships
Nations at the 2019 World Aquatics Championships
2019